Volusius or Volusia may refer to:

People
 Volusius, an annalist mentioned in the poetry of Catullus

Places
 Volusia, Florida, an unincorporated community
 Volusia County, Florida, a county in east-central Florida

See also
Volusia gens, an ancient Roman gente